María del Carmen Carrasco y Llorente was a Guatemalan woman, wife of the Head of Government Enrique Peralta Azurdia. She served as First Lady of Guatemala during the term of her husband, was known to be one of the first wives of a president to have received a special pension after the death of her husband.

References

Date of birth missing
Year of birth missing
Date of death missing
Year of death missing
First ladies of Guatemala